San José Airport  is an airport serving the island of San José, in the Pearl Islands archipelago of Panama.

The east approach and departure are over water and an overrun on the east end terminates with a steep drop into the ocean.

Airlines and destinations

See also

Transport in Panama
List of airports in Panama

References

External links
OpenStreetMap - San José Airport
OurAirports - San José Island Airport
FallingRain - San José Island Airport

Airports in Panama
Buildings and structures in Panamá Province